Jakob Olsson (born 14 August 1991) is a Swedish footballer who as a winger or forward.

References

External links

Fotbolltransfers profile

1991 births
Living people
Swedish footballers
Swedish expatriate footballers
Association football midfielders
GAIS players
Örgryte IS players
Sandnes Ulf players
Ljungskile SK players
Varbergs BoIS players
Superettan players
Allsvenskan players
Eliteserien players
Swedish expatriate sportspeople in Norway
Expatriate footballers in Norway